The 2012–13 Arkansas Razorbacks men's basketball team represented the University of Arkansas in the 2012–13 college basketball season. The team's head coach is Mike Anderson, who completed his second season at Arkansas after posting an 18-14 record during the 2011–2012 season, where the Razorbacks finished ninth in the SEC. Arkansas finished seventh in the SEC, but a 1-12 record away from the state of Arkansas kept it from participating in the postseason. The team played their home games at Bud Walton Arena in Fayetteville, Arkansas, as a member of the SEC.

Roster

Schedule and results

|-
!colspan=12| Exhibition

|-
!colspan=12| Non-Conference Regular Season

|-
!colspan=12| SEC Regular Season

|-
!colspan=12| 2013 SEC tournament

|-
| colspan="12" | *Non-Conference Game. Rankings from AP poll. All times are in Central Time.
|}

See also
2012–13 NCAA Division I men's basketball season
2012–13 NCAA Division I men's basketball rankings

References

Arkansas
Arkansas Razorbacks men's basketball seasons
Razor
Razor